Elroy Harris (born August 18, 1966) is a former American football running back. He played for the Seattle Seahawks in 1989, the Montreal Machine in 1991 and for the Birmingham Fire from 1991 to 1992.

References

1966 births
Living people
American football running backs
Eastern Kentucky Colonels football players
Seattle Seahawks players
Montreal Machine players
Birmingham Fire players